SeaCat can refer to:
Sea Cat, a surface-to-air missile
SeaCat, a former Scottish ferry service
SeaCat Tasmania, former name of the ferry HSC Emeraude France
Sea Cat, a Dungeons & Dragons monster.
Ariidae, a family of catfish sometimes called "sea cat" or "sea catfish".
Black-tailed gull, a family of gulls sometimes called umineko ("sea cat" in Japanese) due to their cat-like calls.
Umineko When They Cry, a visual novel often nicknamed "seacats" by fans due to the name (which refers to the black-tailed gull).